Krasnoyarsky (masculine), Krasnoyarskaya (feminine), or Krasnoyarskoye (neuter) may refer to:
Krasnoyarsk Krai (Krasnoyarsky krai), a federal subject of Russia
Krasnoyarsky District, name of several districts in Russia
Krasnoyarsky (rural locality) (Krasnoyarskaya, Krasnoyarskoye), several rural localities in Russia

See also
Krasnoyarsk (disambiguation)
Krasny Yar (disambiguation)